Founded in 1998 by comedian Greg Fleet, the Piece of Wood Award is awarded during the Melbourne International Comedy Festival to the best show as voted by a committee of comedians which includes all past winners of the award. Literally a piece of wood, it is traditional for winners to bite the award.

Past winners have included:

 1998 - Linda Haggar and Fahey Younger - Lost due to war
 1999 - Simon Munnery
 2000 - Stewart Lee
 2001 - Rich Fulcher
 2002 - Charlie Pickering - Boiling Point and  Michael Chamberlin
 2003 - Justin Hamilton
 2004 - Andrew McClelland- Andrew McClelland's Somewhat Accurate History of Pirates (1550-2017)
 2005 - Tony Law
 2006 - Fiona O'Loughlin and Damian Callinan - Spaznuts (Shared)
 2007 - Andy Zaltzman
 2008 - Tom Gleeson
 2009 - Lawrence Mooney - Make The Girls Laugh
 2010 - Sam Simmons - Fail
 2011 - Harley Breen - I Heart Bunnings: Stories About My Brothers
 2012 - Bob Franklin and Steven Gates - Stubborn Monkey Disorder
 2013 - David Quirk - Shaking Hands With Danger
 2014 - Sarah Kendall - Touchdown
 2015 - Anne Edmonds - You Know What I'm Like
 2016 - Chris Wainhouse
 2017 - Luke Heggie - Rough Diamanté
 2018 - Heath Franklin - Chopper
 2019 - Geraldine Hickey - Things are going well
 2021 - Greg Larsen - This might not be hell
 2022 - Tina Del Twist - Caravan in the Sky

External links
Official MICF Awards Page

Australian comedy awards